Skedsmokorset is a village in the municipality of Lillestrøm and in the county of Akershus. Its population is approximately 15,000.

Villages in Akershus